Cryptobotys is a monotypic moth genus of the family Crambidae described by Eugene G. Munroe in 1956. Its only species, Cryptobotys zoilusalis, was described by Francis Walker in 1859. It is found in Cuba, Jamaica, Puerto Rico, Central America (Honduras, Costa Rica, Mexico) and the southern United States, where it has been recorded from Florida.

Adults are cinereous (ash gray) with whitish interior and exterior lines, slightly bordered with brownish. The marginal line is brownish. Adults have been recorded on wing from February to August and from November to December in Florida.

The larvae feed on Xanthium strumarium.

References

Spilomelinae
Crambidae genera
Monotypic moth genera
Taxa named by Eugene G. Munroe